Najeeb Elias "Jeeb" Halaby Jr. (November 19, 1915 – July 2, 2003) was an American businessman, government official, aviator, and the father of Queen Noor of Jordan. He is known for making the first transcontinental jet flight in American history and his service as chairman of Pan Am from 1969 to 1972.

Early life and ancestry
Halaby was born in Dallas, Texas. His father was Najeeb Elias Halaby (March 17, 1878/1880 – December 16, 1928), a Lebanese-Syrian Christian who was born in Zahle and whose parents hailed from Aleppo, arrived in the United States in 1891. Halaby's paternal grandfather was Elias Halaby, a provincial treasurer or magistrate in Ottoman Syria, who also came to the United States in 1891. 

Halaby's father worked as an importer, and later as an oil broker; in the mid-1920s he opened Halaby Galleries, a rug boutique and interior-decorating shop, at Neiman Marcus in Dallas, and ran it with his American wife, Halaby's mother, the former Laura Wilkins (April 23, 1889 – April 1987). His father died shortly afterward, and his estate was unable to continue the new enterprise. Following the death of Halaby's father, Laura Halaby married Urban B. Koen, but they ultimately divorced. Halaby's maternal grandfather was John Thomas Wilkins, who served in the 7th Tennessee Cavalry during the American Civil War.

Career

Halaby was a graduate of The Leelanau School, a boarding school in Glen Arbor Township, Michigan, and is enshrined in that school's Hall of Fame. An alumnus of Stanford University (1937) and Yale Law School (1940), he served as a U.S. Navy test pilot during World War II. On May 1, 1945, Halaby made history by making the first transcontinental jet flight in U.S. history. Halaby took off from Muroc AFB, California, and landed at Patuxent River NAS, Maryland, 5 hours and 40 minutes later.

After the war he served as the U.S. State Department's civil aviation advisor to King Abdul Aziz Ibn Saud of Saudi Arabia, helping the King develop Saudi Arabian Airlines. Next, he worked as an aide to Secretary of Defense James Forrestal in the late 1940s, then helped Paul Nitze write NSC 68. He joined Laurance Rockefeller's family office in 1953, reviewing investments in civil aviation.

From 1961 to 1965, he served as the second Administrator of the Federal Aviation Agency (FAA) – the future Federal Aviation Administration, having been appointed by President John F. Kennedy. Halaby was a proponent for the creation of the United States Department of Transportation, which occurred in April 1967 during his time in the Lyndon B. Johnson administration. During his tenure as FAA administrator, he also was the lead proponent of the Boeing 2707 Supersonic Jet. President Johnson signed Executive Order 11149 approving $1 billion to build a US made SST, but eventually the project was cancelled in 1971 because of its cost. 

From 1969 to 1972, he served as CEO, and chairman after 1970, of Pan American World Airways. As Pan American World Airways chairman, he was present at the christening of the first Boeing 747 aircraft.

Personal life
Halaby was married three times. He married Doris Carlquist in Washington, D.C., on December 24, 1945 until he divorced her in 1977. They had three children: daughter Lisa, who became Queen of Jordan in 1978; son Christian; and daughter Alexa. He attended the state funeral of his son-in-law King Hussein as a member of the United States delegation in February, 1999.

He was married to the former Jane Allison Coates from 1980 until her death in 1996. From 1997 until his death in 2003 at age 87, he was married to Libby Anderson Cater.

References
 

1915 births
2003 deaths
Administrators of the Federal Aviation Administration
United States Department of State officials
United States Department of Defense officials
Kennedy administration personnel
Lyndon B. Johnson administration personnel
American people of Lebanese descent
American University of Beirut trustees
Pan Am people
Businesspeople from Dallas
Military personnel from Dallas
People from McLean, Virginia
Businesspeople from Virginia
Military personnel from Virginia
Stanford University alumni
Yale Law School alumni
Hussein of Jordan
Stanford University trustees
United States Navy pilots of World War II